Alyssa Mary Stringfellow (born 17 May 1985) is a New Zealand born actress, model and musician. She began modeling and performing at a young age, and won the title of Miss North Island New Zealand at the age of 17.

Background
Alyssa Stringfellow was born in Rotorua, New Zealand. When she was 4 years old her family moved to Swansea. At a young age her first instrument was the violin. She progressed to singing, dancing and acting attending, participating in as many theatre productions as she could. When Stringfellow was 5 years old she got her first role as Young Cossette in Les Miserables, and many leads in her school productions followed.

When Stringfellow was 11 years old her family moved back to New Zealand, to a town called Taupo. There, she continued performing in town productions, dancing, singing in productions such as Joseph and the Technicolor Dreamcoat, Bad Jelly the Witch, Anything Goes, Jesus Christ Superstar, Aotea Spectacular and The Wizard of Oz.

Throughout Stringfellow's school life she performed in every school production she could manage along with her studies and outside classes. By the time she was 16, she was studying piano, dance and acting outside of school hours. In her second to last year of high school, she was voted a student leader of dance. She had the honor of choreographing for the next two years, running the school's entry into the Smoke Free Sage Challenge (a dance based competition among all the schools in New Zealand), where she won numerous awards in choreography for the school. She also began teacher aiding dance to younger classes and taught choreography during lunch breaks to any dancers who needed help.

Stringfellow's modeling career began at the age of 17 when she won the title of Miss North Island New Zealand.

She moved to Auckland to go to university and study a Bachelor of Performing and Screen Arts, majoring in dance minors in screen performance and vocals.

She started promotional modeling and created a group called Nitro Girls Dance Troup which took the girls all around New Zealand dancing at different events.

Stringfellow then flew to Australia to represent New Zealand in the Miss International pageant in 2006, where she placed first. She then decided to move to Australia to broaden her career prospects. She began competing in small modeling competitions and won numerous titles, including Miss Fresh Water Beach, Miss Jim beam, Miss Model of the World New Caledonia, Miss Star University Australia, Miss Bikini International Wales, Miss Tourism Queen Wales, Miss Humanity Australia and Miss Supermodel of Asia Australia.

In Sydney, she began seriously pursuing a career in modeling and acting. She began modeling for Sony, Fujitsu and FHM magazine, and began to branch into television as well appearing in several music videos, commercials, reality TV (such as FHMs Lara Croft Challenge), and recently played the role of Clara on the Australian series Rescue: Special Ops.

In May 2009 she moved to Los Angeles, California, where she currently resides. She has since been featured in several fashion pageants and runway shows, and played the female lead in a national commercial for Nicoderm CQ.

Stringfellow can currently be seen on KFC hot and Spicey TVC. She won out over other contenders to gain her first lead role in the star studded Australian feature film Calendar Girls, set to film in Cairns, Queensland.

Filmography

References

External links
 Alyssastringfellow.com
 
 Taupos-top-model-gives-it-a-twirl-in-Hollywood 
 rock-role-adds-new-string-to-models-cv
 supermodelofasia.com
 misshumanityinternational.com

New Zealand television actresses
1985 births
Living people